Tom Fleetwood (born 1888) was a footballer who played in the Football League for Everton, Rochdale and Oldham Athletic.

Fleetwood signed for Everton in 1911 and had a good career playing in a number of positions, he was mainly "A Centre Half as hard as nails" this statement was on a caricature that our family own and his nickname was "THE WAR HORSE" with  a name like that I can only picture a solid dependable, workmanlike figure who was pretty no nonsense figure.

He won the old English First Division Football League with his beloved Everton in the 1914–15 season. Fleetwood later in his career signed for Oldham Athletic but returned to Everton as a scout then had the honour of becoming Chief Scout and had a large influence in the signing/scouting of Dixie Dean and Tommy Lawton.

References

1888 births
English footballers
Association football central defenders
Everton F.C. players
Year of death missing